Exiliados en la Bahía: Lo Mejor de Maná (Exiles at the Bay: The Best of Maná) is a greatest hits compilation album, released on August 28, 2012, by the Mexican Latin pop/Rock en Español band Maná.

The compilation features the single "Hasta Que Te Conocí", an adaptation of the song by Juan Gabriel released on June 25, a  new song, "Un Nuevo Amanecer", two live songs from the Drama y Luz album, and a compilations of singles from 1990-2012. Exiliados en la Bahía: Lo Mejor de Maná won for Rock/Alternative Album of the Year at the Premio Lo Nuestro 2013.

Track listing

Note: The tracks on Disc 2 are digitally remastered (except tracks 1 and 6).

Personnel
 Fher Olvera – main vocals, acoustic & electric guitar, coros, programming,
 Alex González – drums, vocals, coros, programming, keyboards
 Sergio Vallín – acoustic & electric guitars, coros, orchestral arrangements, string arrangements, keyboards, programming
 Juan Diego Calleros – bass

Charts

Weekly charts

Year-end charts

Singles

Certifications

References

External links
Official website of the band
Exiliados en la Bahía: Lo Mejor de Maná on Amazon.com

2012 compilation albums
Maná compilation albums
Warner Music Latina compilation albums
Spanish-language compilation albums